David Robertson (1883 – 11 August 1963) was a British cyclist. He competed in two events at the 1908 Summer Olympics.

References

External links
 

1883 births
1963 deaths
English male cyclists
Olympic cyclists of Great Britain
Cyclists at the 1908 Summer Olympics
Sportspeople from Sheffield
Cyclists from Yorkshire